Raffaele "Raf" Baldassarre (17 January 1932 - 11 January 1995) was an Italian film actor.

Life and career 
Born Raffaele Baldassarre in Giurdignano, Lecce, Apulia, he started his career in the late 1950s, being cast in many peplum and adventure films, alternating between stereotypical roles of the young villain and the loyal friend of the protagonist. Following a fashion of the time for American-sounding stage names, in the second half of the 1960s he was credited "Ralph Baldwyn" or "Ralph Baldwin" in several Spaghetti Westerns. Baldassarre was active until mid-eighties, usually cast in supporting roles, and he occasionally also worked as a producer.

Selected filmography 

 Pirate of the Half Moon (1957) - Un corsaro
 The Pirate of the Black Hawk (1958) - Pirata Rosso
 Pia de' Tolomei (1958)
 The Nights of Lucretia Borgia (1959) - Ruggero
 The Night of the Great Attack (1959) - Young Pickpocket
 The Loves of Salammbo (1960) - Capo Mercenario
 Queen of the Pirates (1960)
 La regina dei tartari (1960) - Prigioniero di Tartari
 The Giants of Thessaly (1960) - Antinoo
 Slave of Rome (1961) - Lucio
 Spade senza bandiera (1961) - Man at Court (uncredited)
 Capitani di ventura (1961)
 Hercules and the Conquest of Atlantis (1961) - Capo delle guardie
 Sword of the Conqueror (1961) - Silvestro
 Nefertiti, Queen of the Nile (1961) - Mareb
 Hercules in the Haunted World (1961) - Un mercenario
 Suleiman the Conqueror (1961) - Boris, Luogotenente
 Erik the Conqueror (1961) - Floki
 Ulysses Against the Son of Hercules (1962) - Prince Adrasto
 The Son of Captain Blood (1962) - Bruno
 The Secret Mark of D'Artagnan (1962) - Montfort
 Gladiator of Rome (1962) - Gladiator
 Attack of the Normans (1962) - Dag
 Shades of Zorro (1962) - Chinto
 The Sign of the Coyote (1963) - Lenny Henchman
 Implacable Three (1963) - Comisario Molero
 The Executioner of Venice (1963) - Messere Grimani
 José María (1963)
 Sandokan to the Rescue (1964) - Teotrokis the Greek
 A Fistful of Dollars (1964) - Juan De Dios (uncredited)
 The Seven from Texas (1964) - Jess
 Seven from Thebes (1964) - Leonidas
 Seven Hours of Gunfire (1965) - Guillermo
 Jesse James' Kid (1965) - Bruce
 Legacy of the Incas (1965) - Geronimo
 Our Man in Jamaica (1965) - Gil
 Hands of a Gunfighter (1965) - Mack
 Canadian Wilderness (1965) - Victor's Friend
 The Relentless Four (1965) - Moss
 Our Men in Bagdad (1966) - Dimitri
 Rojo (1966) - Ramon
 A Stranger in Town (1967) - Corgo
 The Stranger Returns (1967) - Chrysler
 Dakota Joe (1967)
 Tutto per tutto (1968) - Miguel Comaco
 Luana la figlia della foresta vergine (1968)
 The Silent Stranger (1968) - White-Eye (uncredited)
 Man Who Cried for Revenge (1968) - Bandito
 OSS 117 – Double Agent (1968)
 Persecución hasta Valencia (1968)
 Pistol for a Hundred Coffins (1968) - Verdugo
 Giugno '44 - Sbarcheremo in Normandia (1968) - Parker
 Between God, the Devil and a Winchester (1968) - Batch
 The Great Silence (1968) - Sanchez
 Dead Men Don't Count (1968) - Gregory Lassiter
 The Mercenary (1968) - Mateo
 Tarzan in the Golden Grotto (1969)
 Quinto: non ammazzare (1969) - Stagecoach guard
 Tarzana, the Wild Girl (1969) - Fred
 Garringo (1969) - Damon
 I diavoli della guerra (1969) - The Sheik
 Arizona Colt Returns (1970) - Biggle
 Sartana Kills Them All (1970) - Fred Burton
 Hey Amigo! A Toast to Your Death (1970) - Manolo
 Dig Your Grave Friend... Sabata's Coming (1971) - Sabata
 Four Gunmen of the Holy Trinity (1971) - Dingus
 And the Crows Will Dig Your Grave (1971) - Sheriff of Silver Town
 Il ritorno del gladiatore più forte del mondo (1971) - The Fox
 Web of the Spider (1971) - Herbert
 Drummer of Vengeance (1971) - Jason
 Blindman (1971) - Mexican General
 Prey of Vultures (1972) - Joe Porter, Blacksmith
 They Believed He Was No Saint (1972) - Director de la prisión
 Zambo, il dominatore della foresta (1972) - Juanez
 1931: Once Upon a Time in New York (1973) - Raf - Pole's Henchman (uncredited)
 The Killer with a Thousand Eyes (1973) - Olalia
 Zinksärge für die Goldjungen (1973) - Sergio
 Dagli archivi della polizia criminale (1973) - Hastruan's henchman (uncredited)
 Cugini carnali (1974)
 The Killer Wore Gloves (1974) - Man at Subway Station (uncredited)
 Eyeball (1975) - Martinez - the tour guide
 Get Mean (1975) - Diego
 Geometra Prinetti selvaggiamente Osvaldo (1976)
 Le seminariste (1976) - Il prefetto
 Safari Express (1976)
 Piccole labbra (1978)
 Improvviso (1979) - L'infermiere Antonio
 Pensieri Morbosi (1980) - History Professor
 La moglie in bianco... l'amante al pepe (1981) - Cosmo
 Fantasma d'amore (1981) - Luciano
 La dottoressa preferisce i marinai (1981) - The tanning Man
 Thor the Conqueror (1983) - Gnut
 Hercules (1983) - Sostratos
 The Adventures of Hercules (1985) - Atreus (final film role)

References

External links 
 

1932 births
1995 deaths
Male actors from Rome
Italian male film actors
Italian male television actors
Italian male stage actors
20th-century Italian male actors
Male Spaghetti Western actors
People of Lazian descent